Tohui or Towi (July 21, 1981 - November 16, 1993) is the name of the second giant panda to be born in captivity outside of China, and the first overseas-born giant panda to survive into adulthood. She became a cultural icon in Mexico.

Tohui is from Tarahumara (the language of the Raramuri) and means "(male) child". (Variants: tohui, toui, towi). When Tohui was born it was believed she was male, and the contrary was only learned after a contest for the name was held. The female equivalent is Tehuete.

Biography 
Tohui was born on July 21, 1981 at Chapultepec Zoo in Mexico City. She is the daughter of 'Ying Ying' and 'Pe Pe', a pair of giant pandas gifted to Mexico by the Chinese government on September 10, 1975. In 1980 the couple had their first offspring Xen Li (the first live birth outside China), unfortunately Xen Li lived only eight days.

She had a daughter named Xin Xin, who was conceived naturally with a panda named 'Chia Chia' from the London Zoo.

Tohui died on November 16, 1993, at  the age of 12, victim of a crisis of leptospira. Her remains are on display in Chapultepec Zoo along with her parents and her partner Chia Chia.

Cultural icon 
Following her birth, cameras were installed to monitor her well being (to avoid a repeat of Xen Li who was killed after her mother rolled on her while sleeping). Mexican media were attentive to her condition and as a result of the coverage she received, Tohui became a star in Mexico.

Her presence at Chapultepec catapulted the zoo to fame. The line to visit her reached all the way to the monument of the Niños Héroes. Following her birth, the zoo started to receive considerably more financial support, enough to start its first veterinary hospital.

Her popularity was such that at the request of the then First Lady, Carmen Romano, a song, El pequeño panda de Chapultepec, was created. Composed by Laura Gomez Llanos and performed by singer Yuri. The song went on to sell a million copies.

To celebrate her fifth birthday, the Banco de México minted a commemorative coin, where Tohui appeared in her mother's arms, Ying Ying.

External links
 Music video for "El pequeño panda de Chapultepec"

References 

1981 animal births
1993 animal deaths
Individual giant pandas